The Yakovlev Yak-140 was a Soviet prototype lightweight supersonic fighter developed during the 1950s. The prototype was completed in 1954, but it was denied authorization to enter flight testing and the program was cancelled in 1956.

Development
Its fully loaded weight was to be  and it was to be ready to be submitted for State acceptance trials in March 1955.

The fighter had a circular-section semi-monocoque fuselage with a nose air intake. A range-only radar was fitted in the conical inlet cone of the air intake. The wings had a sweep angle of 55° at quarterchord. Two wing fences were fitted on the upper surface of each wing. The horizontal stabilizer was midway down the rear fuselage and two air brakes were fitted on its underside. The cockpit canopy was faired into the spine that ran the length of the top of the fuselage. The tandem landing gear had a single wheel on the forward unit and twin wheels on the main unit with outrigger struts that retracted aft into wingtip fairings.

The aircraft's State acceptance trials were delayed until the first quarter of 1956 for lack of a flight-ready AM-11 engine, but it had to be adapted to use a less powerful Mikulin AM-9D engine with only  of dry thrust. The gun armament was reduced to only two  Nudelman-Rikhter NR-23 guns with 75 rounds per gun in compensation, but the estimated speed dropped by about  regardless. This was deemed to be acceptable as it sufficed to begin flight testing.

The prototype was completed in December 1954 and it passed all the necessary ground tests by 10 February 1955 when it was cleared to begin flight trials. A Council of Ministers directive was issued on 28 March 1956 to terminate the program and the corresponding MAP order followed on 6 April.

Specifications (with AM-9D (estimated))

Notes

Bibliography

 
 

Yak-140
1950s Soviet fighter aircraft
Abandoned military aircraft projects of the Soviet Union